Speed line is the art technique which uses streaks to convey the impression of speed. The French artist Ernest Montaut is usually credited with its invention. He used the technique freely in his posters which were produced at a time when auto racing, speedboat racing and aircraft races were in their infancy. The effect is similar to the blur caused by panning in still photography.

Speed lines are frequently used in Japanese manga and anime, of which Speed Racer is a classic example.

References

Painting techniques